Memetis, Ο μεμέτης (el) is a Greek folkloric tune (zeibekiko).

See also
zeibekiko

References

Year of song unknown
Greek songs
Glykeria songs